Sphingonotus rubescens is a species of band-winged grasshopper in the family Acrididae. It is found in the Palearctic.

Subspecies
These subspecies belong to the species Sphingonotus rubescens:
 Sphingonotus rubescens afghanicus Mistshenko, 1937
 Sphingonotus rubescens burri Chopard, 1936
 Sphingonotus rubescens fallax Mistshenko, 1937
 Sphingonotus rubescens fasciatus Mistshenko, 1937
 Sphingonotus rubescens rubescens (Walker, 1870)
 Sphingonotus rubescens subfasciatus Bey-Bienko, 1951

References

External links

 

Oedipodinae